Parmellops is a genus of two species of semislugs that are endemic to Australia's Lord Howe Island in the Tasman Sea.

Species
 Parmellops etheridgei (Brazier, 1889) – Etheridge's semislug
 Parmellops perspicuus Hyman & Ponder, 2016 – transparent semislug

References

 
 

 
 
Gastropod genera
Taxa named by Tom Iredale
Gastropods described in 1944
Gastropods of Lord Howe Island